Sinn refers to the German word Sinn (sense), frequently contrasted with Bedeutung (indication, reference) in discussions of meaning.

Sinn may also refer to:

 Sinn (river), a river in Germany
 Sinn, Hesse, a community in Germany
 Sinn (watchmaker), a German watchmaker
 Sinn, a character on the animated television series Frisky Dingo
 Nickname of the professional wrestler Nick Cvjetkovich
 Sinn Sisamouth, a Khmer singer and songwriter in the 1950s to the 1970s